The Padma Bhushan is the third-highest civilian award of the Republic of India. Instituted on 2January 1954, the award is given for "distinguished service of a high order", without distinction of race, occupation, position, or sex. The recipients receive a Sanad, a certificate signed by the President of India and a circular-shaped medallion with no monetary association. The recipients are announced every year on Republic Day (26January) and registered in The Gazette of Indiaa publication used for official government notices and released weekly by the Department of Publication, under the Ministry of Urban Development. The conferral of the award is not considered official without its publication in the Gazette. The name of a recipient, whose award has been revoked or restored, both of which require the authority of the President, is  archived and they are required to surrender their medal when their name is struck from the register. , none of the conferments of Padma Bhushan during 2010s have been revoked or restored. The recommendations are received from all the state and the union territory governments, as well as from Ministries of the Government of India, the Bharat Ratna and the Padma Vibhushan awardees, the Institutes of Excellence, the Ministers, the Chief Ministers and the Governors of State, and the Members of Parliament including private individuals.

When instituted in 1954, the Padma Bhushan was classified as "Dusra Warg" (Class II) under the three-tier Padma Vibhushan awards, which were preceded by the Bharat Ratna in hierarchy. On 15January 1955, the Padma Vibhushan was reclassified into three different awards as the Padma Vibhushan, the Padma Bhushan and the Padma Shri. The criteria included "distinguished service of a high order in any field including service rendered by Government servants", but excluded those working with the public sector undertakings with the exception of doctors and scientists. The 1954 statutes did not allow posthumous awards; this was subsequently modified in the January 1955 statute. The centrally placed pattern made of outer lines of a square of  side is embossed with a knob carved within each of the outer angles of the pattern. A raised circular space of diameter  is placed at the centre of the decoration. A centrally located lotus flower is embossed on the obverse side of the medal and the text "Padma" is placed above and the text "Bhushan" is placed below the lotus written in Devanagari script. The State Emblem of India is displayed in the centre of the reverse side, together with the national motto of India, "Satyameva Jayate" (Truth alone triumphs) in Devanagari script, which is inscribed on the lower edge. The rim, the edges and all embossing on either side is of standard gold with the text "Padma Bhushan" of gold gilt. The medal is suspended by a pink riband  in width with a broad white stripe in the middle. It is ranked fifth in the order of precedence of wearing of medals and decorations of the Indian civilian and military awards.

As of 2023, a total of 51 individuals have been conferred with the award and have been conferred upon six foreign recipients one from Bangladesh and Mexico each and six from the United States of America. Individuals from ten different fields were awarded, which includes one from medical field, two civil servants, sportspersons and from Science & Engineering field each, three from social work, seven artists, eight from literature and education, nine from trade and industry, eleven from public affairs, and six from other fields. Most recently on 25 January 2023, the award has been bestowed upon nine recipients.

Recipients

Explanatory notes

Non-citizen recipients

Posthumous recipients

References

External links
 
 

Lists of Indian award winners
2020s in India
2020s-related lists